Frédéric Choffat (born June 9, 1973) is a French-speaking Swiss director.

Filmography

References

External links
  Official website
 Director website

Swiss film directors
Living people
1973 births